GA1 or GA-1 may refer to:

Science and Medicine
 GA1, Glutaric aciduria type 1, an inherited genetic disorder
 GA1, Gibberellin A1, a form of the gibberellin plant hormone

Transport
 Boeing GA-1, a 1921 American armored triplane
 Celair GA-1 Celstar, South African aerobatic glider 
 GA 1, the U.S. Route 27 in Georgia, USA

Other
 Ga1, Golden Axe (video game), a side-scrolling arcade hack and slash game released in 1989 by Sega
 GA-1, the Georgia's 1st congressional district
GA1, the United Nations General Assembly First Committee (also DISEC or C1)